Tholi Tirupati is a south Indian village in Peddapuram Mandal in East Godavari District of Andhra Pradesh.

Tholi Tirupati is one of the famous ancient temples of South India, Located near Peddapuram, East Godavari, Andhra Pradesh; famous for Divine Lord Sringara Vallabha Swami.  This temple is said to be 9000 years old. There are 3 major and unique things we can witness:
 Smiling posture of Lord Venkateswara
 Lord will be seen as small Venkatesa for Children and Big Venkatesa for Elders (various sizes lord is visible to people)
 Sankha and Chakra are in altered positions in comparison with Lord Balaji of tirupati. It is also called Toli Tirupati.

Villages in East Godavari district